James Totten (September 11, 1818 – October 1, 1871) was a career American soldier who served in the United States Army and retired from active service in 1870 as the Assistant Inspector General. He served as an officer in the Union Army and Missouri militia general during the American Civil War.  He may be related to Chief Engineer of the U.S. Army Brigadier General Joseph Totten.

Early life and career
Totten was born in 1818 in Pittsburgh, Pennsylvania, He graduated from the United States Military Academy in 1841 and subsequently became a first lieutenant in 1847 before fighting Seminole Indians in Florida during 1849-50. After attaining the rank of captain in 1855, he went to Bleeding Kansas to try to suppress the disturbances there.

Civil War service
In February 1861, shortly before the American Civil War began, Totten was in command of the Little Rock Arsenal with just 65 men. He was forced to evacuate his forces to St. Louis when about 5,000 pro-secession volunteers led by Governor Henry M. Rector poured into the city and surrounded the federal armory. Serving under generals Nathaniel Lyon and John C. Frémont in Missouri as their chief of artillery, Totten was promoted to lieutenant colonel in September 1861.

He became known for the style which he used to issue orders to his batteries. Punctuated with profanity, a typical order might sound like, "Forward that caisson, G-d d--n you, sir!" It was claimed that some soldiers would walk half a mile just to listen to Totten for five minutes. On February 12, 1862, Totten was promoted to brigadier general in the Missouri Militia.  Totten commanded the 2nd Division in the Army of the Frontier in 1862.  He was not present with the division when it went into action at the battle of Prairie Grove and was therefore led by Colonel Daniel Huston, Jr.  In 1865 Totten commanded the artillery in the Military Division of West Mississippi and participated in the battle of Fort Blakely.

Following the war, the Army issued a large number of brevet (honorary) promotions to hundreds of officers to recognize their service. Totten received a brevet appointment to the rank of colonel in the Regular Army (United States) 'for gallant and meritorious service during the siege of Mobile, Alabama", to rank from March 13, 1865. On July 17, 1866, President Andrew Johnson nominated Totten for appointment to the rank of brevet brigadier general in the regular army, "for gallant and meritorious service in the field during the war", to rank from March 13, 1865, and the United States Senate confirmed the appointment on July 23, 1866.

Postbellum

After the conclusion of the Civil War, Totten served as Inspector-General of the Military Division of the Atlantic from August 15, 1865 to August 27, 1866, and of the Department of the East, from August 27, 1866, to July 10, 1869 and of the Military Division of the South until April, 1870.

He was promoted to Lieutenant Colonel and Assistant Inspector-General on June 13, 1867.

Totten was dismissed from the Army on July 22, 1870 for "Disobedience of Orders, Neglect of Duty and 
Conduct to the Prejudice of Good Order and Military Discipline."

Totten died in Sedalia, Missouri, on October 2, 1871, and was buried in Crown Hill Cemetery.

Family
Totten had two sons who attended West Point.  The eldest was Charles A.L. Totten, who graduated from West Point in 1873 and served in the Army for 20 years before resigning.  After leaving the Army he authored numerous books on esoteric subjects.  The younger was John Reynolds Totten, who graduated from West Point in 1878, was promoted to first lieutenant in 1886 and resigned from the Army on April 1, 1891. After leaving the Army, he pursued his interests in genealogy and hereditary societies.

See also

List of American Civil War brevet generals (Union)

Notes

References
 Cullum's Register of USMA Graduates
 
 Eicher, John H., and David J. Eicher, Civil War High Commands. Stanford: Stanford University Press, 2001. .

1818 births
1871 deaths
People of Pennsylvania in the American Civil War
United States Military Academy alumni
Union Army officers
Union militia generals
United States Army officers
American people of the Seminole Wars
Military personnel from Pittsburgh